Pulteney Square Historic District is a national historic district located at Hammondsport in Steuben County, New York. The district includes 15 contributing buildings, one contributing structure (bandstand), one contributing site (village green), and three contributing secondary buildings.  The structures are clustered around Pulteney Square, a village green roughly 140 feet square, and date from the 1820s to 1920s.

It was listed on the National Register of Historic Places in 1999.

Gallery

References

Historic districts on the National Register of Historic Places in New York (state)
Queen Anne architecture in New York (state)
Historic districts in Steuben County, New York
National Register of Historic Places in Steuben County, New York